Robert James Tennent (1803 – 25 May 1880) was an Irish Whig politician.

Born in Belfast and the son of Robert Tennent, medical doctor, merchant, and philanthropist, and Eliza née Macrone, Tennent was educated at the Royal Belfast Academical Institution and in Trinity College Dublin.

In 1824, with his friend James Emerson, he volunteered to join the Greeks in their War of Independence. For Tennent, it was with conviction that having "learned too feelingly the black consequences of slavery by the wretched example of may own country", Ireland, he could not "remain a passive spectator of the conflict". He was soon disillusioned by the Greek insurgents, concluding that, beyond emancipation from the Turks, they had "no idea of true liberty".

In 1832, the two friends contested Belfast's first competitive parliamentary election. Emerson (who having married an heiress cousin of Tennent's, was now James Emerson Tennent) stood the interest of the town's proprietor, Lord Donegall, as an Independent Whig (but subsequently took the Tory Whip). In the cause of reform, Tennent stood as a Whig and lost. A Protestant loyalist mob celebrated his defeat with an attack on the central Catholic district (Hercules Street) and with an attempt to ransack Tennent's house.

In 1826 Tennent had been admitted to Lincoln's Inn. He was called to the Irish Bar In 1833 he was called to the Irish Bar and to the English Bar in 1834.

In 1830 he married Eliza, daughter of John McCracken in 1830 and niece of the United Irishman Henry Joy McCracken hanged in 1798. They had at least two children Robert Tennent, and Letitia whose son Henry Harrison became an Irish Nationalist (Parnellite) MP.

Tennent succeeded in being elected a Whig Member of Parliament (MP) for Belfast at the 1847 general election and held the seat until 1852, when he was defeated again by a Tory.

References

External links
 

Whig (British political party) MPs for Irish constituencies
UK MPs 1847–1852
1803 births
1880 deaths
Members of the Parliament of the United Kingdom for Belfast constituencies (1801–1922)
Politicians from Belfast
Members of Lincoln's Inn
Lawyers from Belfast
Irish barristers
Alumni of Trinity College Dublin